Saint Martha  may refer to:

 Martha of Bethany, Biblical character and contemporary of Jesus
 Saints Maris, Martha, Abachum and Audifax, third-century martyrs killed for their faith
 Saint Martha, mother of Simeon Stylites the Younger, saint in the Eastern Orthodox church
 Saint Martha (French), fourth-century nun, wife of St Amator
 St Martha, Surrey, a civil parish in England

Title and name disambiguation pages